Pleurobema beadleianum, the Mississippi pigtoe, is a species of freshwater mussel, an aquatic bivalve mollusk in the family Unionidae, the river mussels.

This species is endemic to the United States.

References

Molluscs of the United States
beadleianum
Bivalves described in 1861
Taxonomy articles created by Polbot